The following is a list of musicians who have recorded for the Liberty Records label.

A
Amon Düül II
Alvin and the Chipmunks
Sharon Anderson
Yumi Arai (Toshiba/Alfa/Liberty for her first single, later switched to Toshiba/Alfa/Express for later releases)
Bryan Austin (Patriot/Liberty)
Ethel Azama

B
The Bangles (outside US; Down Kiddie/Liberty)
Stephanie Bentley
John Berry (Patriot/Liberty)
Suzy Bogguss 
Bonzo Dog Band 
Brinsley Schwarz
Walter Brennan
Lisa Brokop (Patriot/Liberty)
Garth Brooks
Kix Brooks
Bud & Travis
John Bunzow
Johnny Burnette

C
Can
Canned Heat
Captain Beefheart (UK)
Vikki Carr
Deana Carter
Carter Family
Joe Carson
Ray Charles
The Chipmunks
Classix Nouveaux
Eddie Cochran
Hank Cochran
Shirley Collie
Creedence Clearwater Revival (UK)

D
Linda Davis
Vic Dana
Charlie Daniels
Billy Dean
Martin Denny
Jackie DeShannon
Dr. Feelgood
George Ducas
The Aynsley Dunbar Retaliation
Tommy Duncan
Johnny Dorelli
Suzanne Doucet

E
Eddie & the Showmen

F
Charlie Floyd
Kim Fowley
Cleve Francis
Fischer-Z

G
The Gants
Tommy Garrett
Henry Gibson
Noah Gordon (Patriot/Liberty)
Ricky Lynn Gregg
The Groundhogs

H
Roy Harper
Hawkwind
Help Yourself
Eddie Heywood
High Tide
Highway 101
Paul Horn
Hour Glass

I
The Idle Race

J
Jan & Dean
David Lynn Jones
Spike Jones

K
Buddy Knox
Alexis Korner
Kostas

L
Chris LeDoux
Gary Lewis & The Playboys
Julie London
Victor Lundberg
Nellie Lutcher

M
The Johnny Mann Singers
Maharishi Mahesh Yogi
Man
Manowar
The Marketts
Billy Maxted
Gene McDaniels
McKenna Mendelson Mainline
Dean Miller
Matt Monro
The Mops (Toshiba/Alfa/Liberty)
Michael Martin Murphey (Liberty)
Anne Murray

N
Willie Nelson
Nitty Gritty Dirt Band

O
Johnny O'Keefe

P
Palomino Road
Patience and Prudence
Robbie Patton
Pearl River
Dave Pell
Pirates of the Mississippi
Popol Vuh
P.J. Proby

R
Gerry Rafferty
The Rankin Family
Buddy Rich
Ricky Lynn Gregg
The Rivingtons
Kenny Rogers

S
Ray Sanders
David Seville
Del Shannon
Ravi Shankar
Shenandoah
Troy Shondell
Red Skelton
Felix Slatkin
Warren Smith
The Stranglers
Sugarloaf

T
Gordon Terry
The T-Bones
Tanya Tucker
Ike & Tina Turner

V
Vanessa-Mae
The Vapors
Bobby Vee
The Ventures

W
Billy Ward
Dottie West
Whitesnake
Wild Rose
Tex Williams
Bob Wills
Brenton Wood
Jeff Wood
Curtis Wright

Y
Timi Yuro

Z
Si Zentner

Liberty